
Gmina Mstów is a rural gmina (administrative district) in Częstochowa County, Silesian Voivodeship, in southern Poland.

Villages
Gmina Mstów contains the villages and settlements of Brzyszów, Cegielnia, Gąszczyk, Jaskrów, Jaźwiny, Kłobukowice, Kobyłczyce, Krasice, Kuchary, Kuśmierki, Latosówka, Łuszczyn, Małusy Małe, Małusy Wielkie, Mokrzesz, Mstów, Pniaki Mokrzeskie, Rajsko, Siedlec, Srocko, Wancerzów and Zawada.

Neighbouring gminas
Gmina Mstów is bordered by the city of Częstochowa and by the gminas of Dąbrowa Zielona, Janów, Kłomnice, Olsztyn, Przyrów and Rędziny.

References

Mstow
Częstochowa County